Triformin (glycerin triformate) is the triester of glycerol and formic acid.

References

Formate esters
Triglycerides